Vakhushti (1696–1757) was a Georgian royal prince (batonishvili), geographer, historian and cartographer. His principal historical and geographic works, Description of the Kingdom of Georgia and the Geographical Atlas, were inscribed on UNESCO's Memory of the World Register in 2013.

Life 
A natural son of King Vakhtang VI of Kartli (ruled 1716–24), he was born in Tbilisi, 1696. Educated by the brothers Garsevanishvili and a Roman Catholic mission, he was fluent in Greek, Latin, French, Turkish, Russian and Armenian.

His name Vakhushti derives from Old Iranian vahišta- ("paradise", superlative of veh "good", i.e., "superb, excellent"). Its equivalent in Middle Persian is wahišt and in New Persian behešt.

In 1719 and 1720, he took part in two successive campaigns against the rebel duke (eristavi) Shanshe of the Ksani. From August to November 1722, he was a governor of the kingdom during his father's absence at the Ganja campaign. Later he served as a commander in Kvemo Kartli. After the Ottoman occupation of Kartli, he followed King Vakhtang in his emigration to the Russian Empire in 1724. Retired to Moscow, Tsarevich Vakhusht (as he came to be known in Russia) was granted a pension. He died at Moscow in 1757. He was buried at the Donskoy Monastery in Moscow, a traditional burial ground of Georgian emigrant royalty and nobility.

Works 

Most of his works were written or completed in Moscow. The best known are Description of the Kingdom of Georgia (completed in 1745), The Geographic Description of Georgia (completed in 1750) and two geographic atlases of the Caucasus region accompanied by the images of several historic coats of arms (1745–46). 

His famous Description of the Kingdom of Georgia is essentially an adorned synopsis of the initial texts of the corpus of medieval Georgian annals, Kartlis Tskhovreba. Vakhushti was critical of the re-edition of the corpus assembled by a scholarly commission chaired by his father Vakhtang VI. So as to rectify perceived oversights of Vakhtang's version, Vakhushti compiled his own comprehensive history and geographical description of the Georgian people and lands. One of the chief goals of his corrective was to underscore all-Georgian political and cultural unity despite the fact that Georgia was politically divided among competing kings and princes during Vakhushti's lifetime. The popularity of Vakhushti's tome is evidenced by the many copies made of it, and his narrative significantly shaped the way in which subsequent generations have conceived of an all-Georgian past. It is also a major source on the Georgian history of the 16th and 17th centuries.

Vakhushti's works were soon translated into Russian and later into French and served as a guide to many contemporary European scholars and travelers to Caucasus up to the early 20th century.

He also completed, together with his brother, Prince Bakar, the printing of the Bible in Georgian, which he had been only partly done by their father, Vakhtang VI. He established for that purpose, in his house near Moscow, a printing-press, taught the art of printing to several Georgian clergymen, and completed the first printed edition of the Bible in Georgian in 1743. The printing-press was afterwards transferred to Moscow, where several religious works in Georgian were printed.

Family 
Vakhushti married in 1717 Mariam, youngest daughter of Giorgi-Malakia Abashidze, ex-King of Imereti (1702–07), and had several children:

 Prince Ioane (1719–1781), general in the Russian service;
 Princess Alexandra (12 August 1721 – 8 April 1789);
 Prince David (1723–1819);
 Princess Mariam (1724–1807); 
 Prince Domenti (1728–1737);
 Prince Nikoloz (died 6 November 1784);
 Princess Anna (1744–1779);
 Prince Iotam (fl. 1737);
 Prince Petre (fl. 1737);
 Princess Guka (fl. 1737).

See also 

 Bagrationi
 Bakar Bagrationi
 George, Prince of Georgia

References 

 Gabashvili, Valerian. Vakhushti Bagrationi. Tbilisi, 1969 (Georgian)
This article incorporates text from the Penny Cyclopædia of the Society for the Diffusion of Useful Knowledge, a publication now in the public domain.

18th-century historians from Georgia (country)
Geographers from Georgia (country)
18th-century geographers
House of Mukhrani
1696 births
1757 deaths
People from Tbilisi
18th-century cartographers
Illegitimate children of Vakhtang VI
18th-century writers of Safavid Iran
Cartographers from Georgia (country)